Townsend Hook is a  gauge Fletcher, Jennings & Co.  steam locomotive built in 1880 for the Dorking Greystone Lime Co. as works no. 172L.  Townsend Hook is cosmetically restored and based at Amberley Museum & Heritage Centre, West Sussex.

Industrial Service
In the late 1870s the Dorking Greystone Lime Co. of Betchworth, Surrey, decided there was a need for steam locomotives to work the horse drawn narrow gauge lines in their quarry.  Following on from the success of their 1877 standard gauge Fletcher Jennings 0-4-0T No. 3 (later named Captain Baxter, now preserved at the Bluebell Railway, they decided on Fletcher Jennings products again.  Two new engines, works nos. 172L and 173L (later becoming Townsend Hook and William Finlay respectively) were built in early 1880 at Fletcher Jennings' Lowca Works and dispatched to Betchworth by rail.  The locos had some issues, such as the wooden brake blocks catching fire due to the friction caused by braking the heavy loads of chalk.  This was remedied by fitting of metal brake blocks on both engines.  In time other modifications took place such as replacing the original Friedman injectors mounted underneath the cab with new Penberthy injectors mounted on the tanks tops; and also the addition of cabs.  Townsend Hook's boiler was replaced in 1897 with William Finlay's being replaced in 1922.  In 1937 Townsend Hook was hit side on by a rake of wagons descending under gravity, knocking it eight feet down a ledge, dislodging the safety valves and enveloping the loco in steam.  Fortunately the damage was not too extensive and Townsend Hook was quickly repaired.  Townsend Hook was eventually withdrawn in 1952 with a broken axle bearing and was placed into storage.

Preservation
In 1960 Townsend Hook was acquired by the London Area Group of the Narrow Gauge Railway Society and moved to Sheffield Park station goods yard on the then-newly preserved Bluebell Railway.  Townsend Hook was the first loco to be based on the Bluebell Railway in the preservation era, arriving around a month before the famous LB&SCR A1X 'Terrier' class loco, no. 55 Stepney

In 1962 the NGRS acquired a site in a former quarry at Brockham, Surrey, only a few miles from Betchworth, to build a museum dedicated to industrial and narrow gauge railways.  Townsend Hook moved there in 1962, being joined there by former Betchworth Orenstein & Koppel diesel locos no. 6 Monty and No. 7 The Major, as well as two Betchworth wagons.  In 1976 Townsend Hook appeared in the Doctor Who serial, The Deadly Assassin, along with other Brockham exhibits.

In 1982, the Brockham Museum was forced to close, mainly due to access problems.  Townsend Hook was moved, along with the rest of the collection, to Amberley Museum.  There it stood outside until 1995, when it was moved to Eastleigh College to undergo restoration.  Townsend Hook was dismantled and work undertaken on the frames, and new axle boxes and axle bearings were cast.  Unfortunately, due to a change in curriculum at the college work on Townsend Hook was abandoned and it was eventually returned to Amberley where it was stored in a partially dismantled condition until 2010 when work on a cosmetic overhaul was started in earnest.  A return to steam is unlikely for the foreseeable future, due to the limited use the loco would receive, and also that many items such as the boiler and water tanks would need to be replaced.

In July 2016 Townsend Hook visited the Talyllyn Railway in Tywyn, Wales, as a static exhibit as part of a gala to bring together all five surviving locos in the UK built by Fletcher, Jennings and Co.

See also
 Amberley Museum Railway
 Polar Bear (locomotive)

References

External links 
  News article on the Amberley Narrow Gauge website.

0-4-0T locomotives
Individual locomotives of Great Britain
Preserved narrow gauge steam locomotives of Great Britain
Fletcher, Jennings locomotives